Raymond Lloyd Brown (September 7, 1936 – December 25, 2017) was a professional American football defensive back in the National Football League (NFL). After playing college football for the Ole Miss Rebels, he was drafted by the Baltimore Colts in the fifth round (50th overall) of the 1958 NFL Draft. He played three seasons for the Baltimore Colts (1958–1960), and was a member of their back-to-back world championships in 1958 and 1959.

In 1962, Brown graduated from the University of Mississippi School of Law, where he was associate editor of the Mississippi Law Journal. He then clerked for a year for U.S. Supreme Court Justice Tom C. Clark. Brown died on December 25, 2017, in Gautier, Mississippi, at age 81.

See also 
 List of law clerks of the Supreme Court of the United States (Seat 10)

References

1936 births
2017 deaths
Sportspeople from Clarksdale, Mississippi
Sportspeople from Greenville, Mississippi
Players of American football from Mississippi
American football defensive backs
American football quarterbacks
Ole Miss Rebels football players
Baltimore Colts players
Law clerks of the Supreme Court of the United States